Robert Koch (born 7 October 1977), best known by the stage name Robot Koch, is a German, Los Angeles-based artist, composer, and record producer. Koch made a name for himself as a member of the band Jahcoozi before launching as a solo artist. His electronic music sound has been called "Wonderful and Strange - pop music from the future" by John Peel of the BBC, in 2003.

Background
Koch was introduced to the piano at six years of age, and later to the drums at thirteen. He has said that both instruments were helpful in his later years as a composer, giving him a foundation in a harmonic and a rhythmic understanding of music. He worked as a composer and producer in Berlin up until 2013, when he relocated to Los Angeles, California.

While Koch has been releasing his own original material on the labels Monkeytown Records, Project Mooncircle, Bpitch Control, and Four Music, he has been a successful producer, remixer, and collaborator for other musicians such as Tensnake, Norah Jones, Bassnectar, and Max Richter. He has worked as a producer and composer for both indie and major artists worldwide, and has won gold and platinum records for his production work for Marteria, Casper, and K.I.Z.
In 2014, he won the German Music Composers Award in the category "Best Electronic Music Composer".

Koch's music has been used in numerous television shows and films, including NBC's The Blacklist, ABC's How to Get Away with Murder, MTV's Teen Wolf, and the trailer for San Andreas.

Projects
In 2016, Koch launched his own label, Trees and Cyborgs.

In 2018, he co-created the immersive audio-visual project "Sphere" in collaboration with visual artist Mickael Le Goff. For the project, Koch's 2018 album Sphere was transformed into film and a visual exploration of space, and exhibited in full-dome venues and planetariums around the world. The full-dome show was designed to transport the audience through space and time using custom projection visuals and atmospheric music, presented in a 3D sound environment.

As part of his work, Koch has also explored modern classical compositions. For the ninth edition of Neue Meister at DRIVE Forum Berlin, the artist, together with Australian violinist and composer Savannah Jo Lack, wrote and performed six pieces that were exclusively composed for the Neue Meister series. The music for this series was released in 2019.

Discography

Solo

Jahcoozi
Studio albums
 Pure Breed Mongrel (2005)
 Blitz 'N' Ass (2007)
 Barefoot Wanderer (2010)

EPs
 Fish 12" (2003)
 V.A.: Girls (2004)
 Rebel Futurism Part 2 (2004)
 Black Barbie (2005)
 Black Barbie/Stereotyp Rmx (2006)
 Reworks (2007)
 Double Barrel Name (2007)
 BLN (2007)
 Namedropper (2009)
 Barbed Wire (2009)
 Watching You (2009)
 Barefoot Wanderer Remixes PT 1 (2010)
 Barefoot Wanderer Remixes PT 2 (2010)

The Tape vs RQM
 Hungry Man EP (2005)
 Autoreverse (2005)
 Public Transport (2007)
 Luvley 12" (2008)

Robot Koch vs Cerebral Vortex
 Vortex Cookies (2008)
 Upside Down EP (2009)
 Aftershocks EP (2009)

Fiora & Robot Koch
 "Dreams of You" single (2011)
 "Let It Go By" single (2017)

Robots Don't Sleep
 Robots Don't Sleep EP (2012)
 Mirror (2013)

Robot Koch and Savannah Jo Lack
 Particle Fields (2016)
 Particle Fields Reimagined (2017)
 Otherwhere (2019)

Delhia de France & Robot Koch
 "California Dreamin" single (2015)
 Moirai EP (2018)

Other projects
 Goodman & Clean – Lights EP (2000)
 Back 2 Square 1 – The State of the World (2002)
 Autodrive – 4 Girls EP (2005)
 The Tape – Perpetual Dubbing (2005)
 MMDC – Love Your Sister (2006)
 Autodrive – Exponential (2006)
 Autodrive vs. Jahcoozi – Hiding from the Truth (2008)
 Robot Koch and John Robinson – Robot Robinson (2011)
 Robot Koch x Susie Suh – Here with Me (2014)
 May & Robot Koch – Gold EP (2018)
 Robot Koch & Schwarzmodul – "Black Water" single (2019)
 Robot Koch & Ian Urbina – Albatross EP (2020)
 Robot Koch –  soundtrack (2021)

Remixes, production, and features

 Panorama – "Super Race Monkey [Jahcoozi Remix]" (2003)
 Mendelson – "White Canary [Jahcoozi Remix]" (2004)
 Inverse Cinematics [The Tape Remix]" (2005)
 Tolcha feat. Jahcoozi – "Crushed Like Ice" (2005)
 Raz Ohara – "Hymn [Jahcoozi Remix]" (2005)
 Justine Electra – "Killalady [The Tape Remix]" (2006)
 Modeselektor feat. Sasha Perera – "Silikon" (2006)
 Data MC – "Pioneer Camp [The Tape Remix]" (2006)
 Unknownmix – "The Siren [Jahcoozi Remix]" (2006)
 Tolcha vs. Soom T – "Send Dem Kids to War [Jahcoozi Remix]" (2007)
 Filewile – "Damn [Jahcoozi Remix]" (2007)
 Missill feat. Jahcoozi – "Glitch EP" (2008)
 Mochipet feat. Jahcoozi – "Microphonepet" (2008)
 Jennifer Rostock – " [Robot Koch Remix]" (2008)
 Jennifer Rostock – " [Robot Koch Remix]" (2008)
 Jennifer Rostock – "Feuer [Robot Koch Remix]" (2008)
 Envy – "Tongue Twister [Robot Koch Remix]" (2008)
 Marsimoto – "" (2008)
 Mochipet – "Rambunction Rmx" (2008)
 Sneaky – "Feel Like a King feat. Barbara Panther [Robot Koch Remix]" (2009)
 King Cannibal & Jahcoozi – "Murder Us" (2009)
 Mexicans with Guns – "Nuts and Bongos" (2009)
 Th Mole – "How 2 Be Cool" (2009)
 Ira Atari – "My Name Is Ira" (2009)
 KU BO – "Kaggua" (2009)
 Marteria – "" (2010)
 Max Mutzke – "Home Work Soul" (2010)
 The Drapers – "We No Speak Americano" (2010)
 Bassnectar – "Teleport Massive" (2010)
 Talen – "The Comic Book EP" (2010)
 Casper – "XOXO" (2011)
 Kraddy – "Let Go" (2011)
 K.I.Z. – "" (2011)
 Graciela Maria – "Many Places" (2011)
 Max Herre – " (remix)" (2012)
 Marsimoto – "" (2012)
 Justine Electra – "Great Skate Date" (2013)
 Julien Mier – "Porcelain Dust" (2013)
 Claire – "The Next Ones to Come" (2013)
 Ok Kid – "Ok Kid" (2013)
 Long Distance Calling – "The Flood Inside" (2013)
 Elenka – "Wolf" (2013)
 Hurts – "Miracle" (2013)
 Alek Fin – "Waiting Like a Wolf Remix" (2013)
 Orsons – "Lagerhalle (remix)" (2013)
 Andrea Balency Crystals" (2014)
 Markus Wiebusch – "Konfetti" (2014)
 Anoushka Shankar & Norah Jones – "The Sun Won't Set" (2014)
 Tensnake – "Holla" (2014)
 Vivaldi – "Summer" (2014)
 Rebeka – "Breath" (2015)
 Kasar – "Gone" (2015) 
 Numaads – "Now" (2015)
 Adiam – "Runaway" (2015)
 Alejandro Bento – "Rain" (2016)
 Equador – "Blood" (2016)
 Dapayk & Padberg – "Sink the Ship" (2016)
 Hundreds – "Spotless" (2016)
 Schwarz – "In Your Eyes" (2017)
 Joplyn – "Too Close" (2017)
 Christian Löffler – "Mare" (2017)
 Anomie Belle – "Flux" (2018)
 Jono McCleery & Sterling Grove – "Beneath" (2018)
 2Raumwohnung – "" (2018)
 John Metcalfe – "When They Weep" (2019)
 Alex Banks – "Chasms" (2020)
 Aparde – "No Need" (2020)

Awards
Deutscher Musikautorenpreis - Best Electronic Music Composer (2014)

References

External links
 

1977 births
21st-century drummers
21st-century German male musicians
21st-century pianists
German drummers
German electronic musicians
German male musicians
German male pianists
German record producers
Living people
Male drummers
Musicians from Kassel